Brendan Blumer (born 1986) is an American-born Hong Kong-based entrepreneur. He is the CEO of the tech company Block.one, which developed the EOS.IO blockchain platform.

Early life 
Blumer was born and raised in Cedar Rapids, Iowa. When he was 15 years old, he developed a website to sell virtual assets in the multiplayer online gaming space. His website, known as Gamecliff (stylized as GaMeCliff), displayed different characters, weapons, and houses for MMORPG games including EverQuest and World of Warcraft.

Career 
In 2005, Blumer's Gamecliff was acquired by IGE and the company moved to its new headquarters in Hong Kong to head Gamecliff's operations. Blumer founded The Accounts Network in 2007, a company that sold in-game MMORPG avatars and reached $1 million in revenue figures.

In 2010, Blumer launched Okay.com, an enterprise data sharing platform for real estate brokers in Asia. The company later merged with the real estate company Asia Pacific Properties. His next business project, ii5, also focused on real estate. Founded in 2013, startup was dedicated to real estate listings in India.

In 2016 Blumer formed Block.One, a blockchain company, based in part on funding from ii5, his Hong Kong real estate firm. Block.one is registered in the Cayman Islands.In May 2017, Blumer announced EOS.IO, a blockchain platform known for its record setting initial coin offering (ICO).

In February 2018, he was listed by Forbes as one of the "richest people in cryptocurrency".

Personal life
In 2020, Bloomer renounced his US citizenship.

References

External links
 

1986 births
Living people
People from Cedar Rapids, Iowa
American technology chief executives
People associated with cryptocurrency
American expatriates in Hong Kong
21st-century American businesspeople